Lin Bu (967–1028) was a Chinese poet during the Northern Song dynasty.  His courtesy name was Junfu (君復). One of the most famous verse masters of his time, Lin lived as a recluse by the West Lake in Hangzhou for much of his later life. His works and theatrical solitude won him nationwide fame, and he was offered prestigious government posts, although he refused all civic duties in pursuit of his poetry. Long after he died, Lin's eccentric attitude and his works retained a vivid place in Song cultural imagination and later works.

Works

Lin is well known for his romantic poems. One example of his works, titled Everlasting Longing is shown below:

Gallery

References

967 births
1028 deaths
Song dynasty poets
Song dynasty calligraphers
Writers from Hangzhou
10th-century Chinese poets
11th-century Chinese poets
Poets from Zhejiang
10th-century Chinese calligraphers
11th-century Chinese calligraphers